Lebanon Church is a census-designated place in Shenandoah County, in the U.S. state of Virginia. The John Marshall Highway passes through it and by the Lebanon Church Cemetery.

References

Census-designated places in Shenandoah County, Virginia
Census-designated places in Virginia